The Metropolitan Police Office (MPO) was the department of the British Home Office which administered the Metropolitan Police of London, the only British territorial police force to be administered by central government. It was based at Scotland Yard and headed by a Secretary, who was, although a civilian, equivalent in rank to the Assistant Commissioners.

History of the Metropolitan Police
Home Office (United Kingdom)